Harry Robert Sindle (14 October 1929 – 24 April 2020) was an American sailor, sailboat designer, and sailboat builder. He was a six-time national champion in the Flying Dutchman class, won a gold medal at the 1959 Pan American Games, competed in the 1960 Summer Olympics, and designed many types of sailboats.

Life and career
Sindle was born in 1929. He was raised in New Jersey. He graduated from Rutgers University, where he studied mechanical engineering.

Sindle competed in international boat races with sailboats including Lightnings, Thistles, Comets, and Flying Dutchmen (all one-design dinghies). He was a six-time national champion in the Flying Dutchman class. Sindle competed for the United states at the 1959 Pan American Games, where he won a gold medal in the Flying Dutchman class. He went on to compete at the 1960 Summer Olympics in Rome, Italy. Sindle sailed in the two-person Flying Dutchman event alongside Robert Wood and placed nineteenth. 

In 1963, Sindle moved to Gloucester, Virginia, to work with Roger Moorman. Moorman designed and built the Mobjack sailboat design. Sindle designed several sailboat classes for the Mobjack Manufacturing Company. Mobjack Manufacturing Company was purchased by Browning Arms Company, where it was renamed Newport Boats and later Gloucester Yachts. Sindle designed sailboat classes such as the Blue Crab 11, Skipjack 15, Newport 17, and Holiday 20. He later built the Buccaneer 18.

Sindle died in April 2020. He was 91 years old and had Parkinson's disease.

Sailboats designed 

 Nomad 20 (first built in 1959)
 Skipjack 15 (first built in 1965)
 Surprise 15 (first built in 1969)
 Blue Crab 11 (first built in 1971)
 Scout 11 (first built in 1971)

References

External links
 
 
 

1929 births
2020 deaths
American male sailors (sport)
Olympic sailors of the United States
Sailors at the 1960 Summer Olympics – Flying Dutchman
Rutgers University alumni
Pan American Games medalists in sailing
Pan American Games gold medalists for the United States
Sailors at the 1959 Pan American Games
Medalists at the 1959 Pan American Games